Thadee Alvaro Ngamba (born 15 December 1998) is a Cameroonian professional footballer who plays as a midfielder for Finnish club Mariehamn, on loan from Kolos Kovalivka in the Ukrainian Premier League.

Club career
He was born in the Cameroonian capital of Yaoundé. At a young age Ngamba went abroad and is a product of the French OGC Nice youth system. At the professional level he played for Paganese Calcio 1926 in the Italian Serie C. In February 2020 he moved to the Belgian club La Louvière Centre, but could not gain a foothold in the team, and in early October 2020 signed a one-year contract with Ukrainian Second League Podillya Khmelnytskyi. He made his Podillya debut on 10 October 2020 in the home match of the 6th round of Group A of the Second League against FC Uzhhorod.

In January 2021 he signed a 2.5 years contract with the Ukrainian Premier League club Kolos.

On 25 January 2022, he joined Mariehamn in Finland on loan for the 2022 season.

References

External links 
 

1998 births
Footballers from Yaoundé
Living people
Association football midfielders
Cameroonian footballers
OGC Nice players
Paganese Calcio 1926 players
UR La Louvière Centre players
FC Podillya Khmelnytskyi players
FC Kolos Kovalivka players
IFK Mariehamn players
Championnat National 2 players
Serie C players
Ukrainian Second League players
Ukrainian Premier League players
Cameroonian expatriate footballers
Expatriate footballers in France
Expatriate footballers in Italy
Expatriate footballers in Belgium
Expatriate footballers in Ukraine
Expatriate footballers in Finland
Cameroonian expatriate sportspeople in France
Cameroonian expatriate sportspeople in Italy
Cameroonian expatriate sportspeople in Belgium
Cameroonian expatriate sportspeople in Ukraine
Cameroonian expatriate sportspeople in Finland